Alfred Hitchcock's Anthology – Volume 1 is the first installment of Alfred Hitchcock's Anthology, one of the many Alfred Hitchcock story collection books; edited by Eleanor Sullivan. Originally published in hardcover in 1976 as Alfred Hitchcock's Tales to Keep You Spellbound, the book is a collection of 30 stories originally published in Alfred Hitchcock's Mystery Magazine.

Contents
The Pursuer by Holly Roth
Final Arrangements by Lawrence Page
Countdown by David Ely
She is Not My Mother by Hilda Cushing
Spook House by Clark Howard
Second Chance by Robert Cenedella
The Last Witness by Robert Colby
Death à la Newburgh by Libby MacCall
A Cold Day in November by Bill Pronzini
A degree of Innocence by Helen Nielsen
The Man We Found by Donald Honig
Night on the Beach by Wenzell Brown
Scott Free by Miriam Lynch
A Very Cautious Boy by Gilbert Ralston
A Try for the Big Prize by Borden Deal
Killed by Kindness by Nedra Tyre
Just a Minor Offense by John Suter
The Long Terrible Day by Charlotte Edwards
Cicero by Edward Wellen
Winter Run by Edward D. Hoch
You Can't Blame Me by Henry Slesar
Death of a Derelict by Joseph Payne Brennan
Present for Lona by Avram Davidson
Murderer #2 by Jean Potts
The Third Call by Jack Ritchie
A Home away from Home by Robert Bloch
The Handyman (1967) by Clayton Matthews
Nothing But Human Nature by Hillary Waugh
Murder, 1990 by C.B. Gilford
Panther, Panther in the Night by Paul W. Fairman

References

1976 anthologies
Mystery anthologies
Works originally published in Alfred Hitchcock's Mystery Magazine
Dial Press books